Demonax is a lunar impact crater near the southern limb of the Moon. This location makes the crater difficult to observe due to foreshortening. The crater is also illuminated at a very low angle, when it is in the sunlit side. Demonax lies just to the north of the crater Scott, one of the south polar formations. To the north-northwest is Boguslawsky.

This crater has a worn and eroded rim, with several small craters lying along the edge and the inner walls. The southeast rim in particular has a notable collection of impacts, including the satellite crater Demonax A which intrudes into the interior floor. The crater bottom has been resurfaced, leaving a flat, level floor. However, there is a group of central peaks near the midpoint, and the northern part of the floor is rough and hummocky. The remains of some terraces are visible along the western interior floor.

Due to the low angle of sunlight reaching this crater, the inner wall along the north side of the crater receives very little sunlight.

Satellite craters 

By convention these features are identified on lunar maps by placing the letter on the side of the crater midpoint that is closest to Demonax.

References 

 
 
 
 
 
 
 
 
 
 
 
 

Impact craters on the Moon